Klang Island ( is an island in Klang District, Selangor, Malaysia with an area of 2.70 km², covered by mangrove swamps. It is the largest island in the district after Indah Island, and the third-largest island of Selangor. It is currently uninhabited.

Nature sites of Selangor
Islands of Selangor